The 50th annual Venice International Film Festival was held on 31 August to 11 September 1993.

Jury
The following people comprised the 1993 jury:
Peter Weir (head of jury)
Mohamed Camara
Carla Gravina
James Ivory
Kaige Chen
Nelson Pereira dos Santos
Abdulah Sidran
Giuseppe Tornatore

Official selection

In competition

Out of competition
   The Age of Innocence (Martin Scorsese) 
   A Bronx Tale (Robert De Niro) 
   Jurassic Park (Steven Spielberg) 
   The Secret of the Old Woods (Ermanno Olmi) 
   Manhattan Murder Mystery (Woody Allen)

Special Screenings
   Pursued (restored, Raoul Walsh) 
   La naissance de l'amour (Philippe Garrel) 
   Johnny Guitar (restored, Nicholas Ray) 
   Donersen Islic Cal (Orhan Oguz) 
   High Boot Benny (Joe Comerford) 
   Sono Kido Wo Tohtte (Kon Ichikawa) 
   Searching for Bobby Fischer (Steven Zaillian) 
   Fermière à Montfaucon (Éric Rohmer) 
   L'Arbre, le maire et la médiathèque (Éric Rohmer) 
   Vigyazok (Sándor Sára) 
   The Hollow Men (Joseph Kay, John Yorick) 
   La estrategia del caracol (Sergio Cabrera) 
   Succede un quarantotto (Nicola Caracciolo, Valerio E. Marino)

Venetian Nights
   L'Enfant lion (Patrick Grandperret) 
   Posse (Mario Van Peebles) 
   La madre muerta (Juanma Bajo Ulloa) 
   In the Line of Fire (Wolfgang Petersen) 
   Diki Vostok (Rachid Nougmanov) 
   What' s Love Got to Do with It (Brian Gibson) 
   The Fugitive (Andrew Davis) 
   Boxing Helena (Jennifer Chambers Lynch) 
   Kalifornia (Dominic Sena) 
   Dave (Ivan Reitman) 
   Quattro bravi ragazzi (Claudio Camarca)

Italian Panorama
   Il giorno di San Sebastiano (Pasquale Scimeca) 
   Condannato a nozze (Giuseppe Piccioni) 
   E quando lei morì fu lutto nazionale (Lucio Gaudino) 
   Portagli i miei saluti (Gianna Maria Garbelli) 
   Mille bolle blu (Leone Pompucci) 
   Lest (Giulio Base)

Window on Images
   Zeit Der Goetter (Lutz Dammbeck) 
   Hercules Returns (David Parker) 
   Terre d' Avellaneda (Daniele Incalcaterra) 
   Strapped (Forest Whitaker) 
   Children of Fate: Life and Death in a Sicilian Family (Andrew Young, Susan Todd) 
   80 Mq (C.Calvi, D.Castelli, L.D' Ascanio, L. Manfredi, I.Agosta) 
   Lettre pour l... (Roman Goupil) 
   Manhattan by Numbers (Amir Naderi) 
   Utopia, utopia, per piccina che tu sia (Umberto Marino) 
   Thirty Two Short Films About Glenn Gould (François Girard) 
   Metisse (Mathieu Kassovitz) 
   Bells from the Deep (Werner Herzog) 
   Memories & Dreams (Lynn Maree Milburn) 
   The Clean Up (Jane Weinstock) 
   Echoes of Time (Ian Rosenfeld)  
   L' écriture de Dieu (H.P.Schwerfel) 
   Der Fenster Putzer (Veit Helmer) 
   Le jour du bac (Thomas Bardinet)  
   The Obit Writer (Brian Cox)  
   Oreste a Tor Bella Monaca (Carolos Zonars) 
   Otonal (Maria Novaro)   
   Swan Song (Kenneth Branagh)

Autonomous sections

Venice International Film Critics' Week
The following feature films were selected to be screened as In Competition for this section:
 Il Tuffo by Massimo Martella (Italy)
 Son of the Shark (Le fils du requin) by Agnès Merlet (France)
 Moonlight Boy (Yue guang shao nian) by Yu Wei-Yen (Taiwan)
 New Germany (Neues Deutschland) by Philip Gröning, Uwe Janson, Gerd Kroske, Dani Levy, Maris Pfeiffer (Germany)
 Public Access by Bryan Singer (United States)
 Suppli by Vincenzo Verdecchi (Italy)
 Touchia by Rachid Benhadj  (Algeria)

Awards

Golden Lion:
Short Cuts (Robert Altman)
Three Colours: Blue (Krzysztof Kieślowski)
Silver Lion:
Kosh ba kosh (Bakhtyar Khudojnazarov)
Grand Special Jury Prize:
Bad Boy Bubby (Rolf de Heer)
Golden Osella:
Best Cinematography: Slawomir Idziak (Three Colors: Blue)
Best Music: Cheb Khaled (1, 2, 3, Sun)
Volpi Cup:
Best Actor: Fabrizio Bentivoglio (Un'anima divisa in due)
Best Actress: Juliette Binoche (Three Colors: Blue)
Best Supporting Actor: Marcello Mastroianni (1, 2, 3, Sun)
Best Supporting Actress: Anna Bonaiuto (Dove siete? Io sono qui)
Best Ensemble Cast: Short Cuts
The President of the Italian Senate's Gold Medal:
Za zui zi (Miaomiao Liu)
Career Golden Lion:
Claudia Cardinale
Robert De Niro
Roman Polanski
Steven Spielberg
Pietro Bianchi Award:
Suso Cecchi d'Amico
Elvira Notari Prize:
The Age of Innocence (Martin Scorsese, Michelle Pfeiffer)
Grand Prize of the European Academy:
1, 2, 3, Sun (Bertrand Blier)
AIACE Award:
La donna del moro (Mauro Borrelli)
Fuori da Qui (Alessandro Tannoia)

References

External links

 
 Venice Film Festival 1993 Awards on IMDb

Venice
Venice Film Festival
1993 film festivals
Film
Venice
August 1993 events in Europe
September 1993 events in Europe